Hinchinbrook Island National Park is Australia's largest island national park. It is situated along the Cassowary Coast Queensland, Australia.  The nearest capital city is Brisbane approximately 1,240 kms to the south. Lucinda is 135 km or 1.5 hours drive north of Townsville being the closest North Queensland provincial city.  Cairns a Far North Queensland provincial city is two and a half to 3 hours drive north from Cardwell.  The main geographical features in the park are the rugged Hinchinbrook Island, including Mount Bowen, The Thumb, Mount Diamantina and Mount Straloch.

The park contains the Thorsborne Trail for hikers.

Situation

The Hinchinbrook Island National Park includes 393 km2 area of Hinchinbrook Island. The continental island has a mountainous interior providing diverse refuges for endemic and Endangered Species, such as dugong and green turtle.

Other conservation parks nearby
These continental islands which are part of the Great Barrier Reef Marine Park are Goold Island National Park, Brook Islands National Park and Family Islands National Park.

See also

 Protected areas of Queensland

References

 Hema maps. (1997). Discover Australia's National Parks. pp 178 – 179 Random House.

External links

National parks of Far North Queensland
Protected areas established in 1932
1932 establishments in Australia